The Lithuanian National Symphony Orchestra or LNSO (Lietuvos nacionalinis simfoninis orkestras, LNSO) is one of Lithuania's two national orchestras, and was founded in 1940.
Melodiya records with Lithuanian conductors and Lithuanian music released during the Soviet era indicate on label and sleeve the LTSR Valstybinis filharmonijos simfoninis orkestras which seems to have been the official name of the orchestra in Soviet times.

The younger Lithuanian State Symphony Orchestra (LVSO) was founded in 1988.

Conductors 
 Balys Dvarionas – 1940–1941, 1958–1964
 Abelis Klenickis – 1944–1945, 1958-1963
 Margarita Dvarionaitė – 1961–1993
 Juozas Domarkas – 1964
 Robertas Šervenikas – 2000
 Modestas Pitrėnas – 2004

See also 
Lithuanian National Philharmonic Society

References

External links

Lithuanian orchestras
Musical groups established in 1940
Music in Vilnius